The San Jose Sharks 2006–07 season was the 16th season played by the franchise.

Offseason
During the 2006 offseason, the San Jose Sharks made significant changes in order to bolster their defense and team grit. The Sharks signed Mike Grier from the Buffalo Sabres and former Shark Curtis Brown from the Chicago Blackhawks, two forwards noted for their defense prowess on both sides of the ice. After signing the two veterans, General Manager Doug Wilson traded their top offensive defenceman in 2005–06, Tom Preissing, to the Ottawa Senators in exchange for centre Mark Bell of the Chicago Blackhawks in a three-way trade involving Martin Havlat going from Ottawa to the Blackhawks. Wilson then traded underachieving winger Nils Ekman to the Pittsburgh Penguins. In August, to round off their flurry of trades, the Sharks signed veterans Mathieu Biron and Patrick Traverse. The Sharks also signed Graham Mink and Scott Ferguson to their American Hockey League (AHL) affiliate, the Worcester Sharks. On October 2, 2006, the Sharks acquired Vladimir Malakhov and a first-round conditional draft pick in exchange for Jim Fahey and Alexander Korolyuk, who was playing in Russia at the time.

Regular season
The Sharks got off to a sizzling 20–7–0 start, the best in franchise history. Shortly after, however, several key players missed time due to injuries, and the Sharks continued to struggle with consistency as their results dropped off. At the end of February, they lost four games in a row, their longest losing streak of the season.

When the trading deadline approached, Wilson used some of his carefully acquired assets to address the team's areas of need, trading draft picks and prospects for Craig Rivet from the Montreal Canadiens and Bill Guerin from the St. Louis Blues. With Rivet playing quality minutes on defense and Guerin scoring goals on offense, the Sharks began winning at a torrid pace, finishing the last 16 games of the regular season with a record of 13–1–3. They concluded the regular season with a total record of 51–26–5 for 107 points, the most wins and points in franchise history. However, in a competitive Western Conference, their record was only good enough for the fifth playoff seed, and they had to open the playoffs on the road.

The Sharks spent the majority of the season rotating their two goaltenders, Vesa Toskala and Evgeni Nabokov, every other game. The only time either one played for an extended period of time was when the other was injured or otherwise unable to play. When Toskala injured his groin, Nabokov made 14-straight starts and played arguably the best hockey of his career, significantly contributing to the Sharks' late-season spate of victories. As a result, despite Toskala's return from injury, Head Coach Ron Wilson retained Nabokov as the number one goaltender to finish the regular season and enter into the playoffs.

The Sharks iced four rookies during the season: Marc-Edouard Vlasic, Matt Carle, Ryane Clowe and Joe Pavelski, with each making significant contributions to the team's success. Vlasic, at just 19-years-of-age, was not expected to make the team, but put together an impressive pre-season performance and was on the Sharks' opening night roster. He went on to play 81 games, leading all NHL rookie defensemen in average ice time at over 21 minutes per game, and was arguably the Sharks' most consistent defenceman the whole season.

In the first round of the playoffs, the Sharks met the Nashville Predators, and advanced to the second round after defeating them 4 games to 1 for the second-straight season. They then fell to the Detroit Red Wings in the semi-finals in six games.

Season standings

Schedule and results

October

November

December

January

February

March

April

Green background indicates win.     
Red background indicates regulation loss.   
White background indicates overtime/shootout loss.

Playoffs

The San Jose Sharks ended the 2006–07 regular season as the Western Conference's fifth seed.

Western Conference Quarter-finals: vs. (4) Nashville Predators
San Jose wins series 4–1

Western Conference Semi-finals: vs. (1) Detroit Red Wings
Detroit wins series 4–2

Green background indicates win.     
Red background indicates loss.

Player statistics

Transactions

Trades

Free agents acquired

Free agents lost

Waiver losses

Draft picks
San Jose's draft picks at the 2006 NHL Entry Draft held at General Motors Place in Vancouver, British Columbia.

External links
Official site of the San Jose Sharks

See also
2006–07 NHL Season

References

Game log: San Jose Sharks game log on espn.com
Team standings: NHL standings on espn.com
Player stats: San Jose Sharks 2006-07 Reg. Season Stats on espn.com
Draft picks: 2006 NHL Entry Draft
Team website: San Jose Sharks
Team info: San Jose Sharks Info on Yahoo! Sports
League website: NHL.com

San
San
San Jose Sharks seasons
San Jose Sharks
San Jose Sharks